The Sacro Monte di Ossuccio (literally "Sacred Mount of Ossuccio") is one of the nine sacri monti in the Italian regions of Lombardy and Piedmont, in northern Italy, which were inscribed on the UNESCO list of World Heritage Sites in 2003.

The devotional complex is located in Ossuccio, on a prealpine crag some 200 metres above the western shore Lake Como, facing Isola Comacina and some 25 km from the city of Como. Surrounded by olive groves and woodland, it is quite isolated from other buildings. The fourteen chapels, constructed between 1635 and 1710 in the typical Baroque style reflecting the Counter Reformation ethos of the sacri monti movement, are joined by a path which leads up to a pre-existing sanctuary of 1532 placed on the summit and dedicated to La Beata Vergine del Soccorso.

External links

Official site 
Sacro Monte di Ossuccio at SacriMonti.net 
 
 

Buildings and structures in the Province of Como
Churches in the province of Como
Ossuccio
Ossuccio
Tourist attractions in Lombardy
World Heritage Sites in Italy
Tremezzina